WEC 8: Halloween Fury 2 was a mixed martial arts event promoted by World Extreme Cagefighting on October 17, 2003, at the Palace Indian Gaming Center in Lemoore, California. The main event saw Cole Escovedo defend the WEC Featherweight title against Anthony Hamlett.

Results

See also 
 World Extreme Cagefighting
 List of WEC champions
 List of WEC events
 2003 in WEC

External links
 WEC 8 Results at Sherdog.com

World Extreme Cagefighting events
2003 in mixed martial arts
Mixed martial arts in California
Sports in Lemoore, California
2003 in sports in California